Van Allen Plexico (born January 12, 1968) is an American professor of Political Science and History, a Sports and Pop Culture podcast host and producer, and a science fiction and fantasy author. He is generally considered one of the leading figures in the New Pulp movement.

Biography

Born in Sylacauga, Alabama, United States, Van Allen Plexico graduated from Auburn University with Bachelor's and master's degrees in 1990 and 1994, doing additional graduate work at Georgetown University and at Emory University.  From 1995 through 2006, he lived and worked in the Atlanta, Georgia metro area, teaching at Georgia Perimeter College and at Shorter University.  In 2006 he was named Assistant Professor of Political Science and History at Southwestern Illinois College, near St. Louis, Missouri. In 2018 he was promoted to full Professor. He has won the Pulp Factory Award for Best Novel of the Year three times (out of six shortlisted finalist nominations), most recently in 2019 for his novel Vegas Heist. He has appeared as a featured speaker before regional literary guilds, book festivals and international organizations of English and Writing instructors, and he has appeared on numerous radio and television programs to discuss his sports writing and commentary. He has worked as a professional sports podcaster and sports author since 2012, covering Auburn University athletics (specifically football and basketball) for the AU Wishbone Podcast, the War Eagle Reader, and as author and editor of numerous books about Auburn football. In 2021, Nissan Motor Company produced a television commercial based on an idea he suggested, as part of their Heisman House campaign, and featuring former Auburn and NFL star, Bo Jackson.

Career

Plexico has lectured, written, and spoken professionally on the craft of fiction writing and the historical roots of contemporary comic books and science fiction and fantasy literature. He has been published in print and online in the areas of sports, book, television, film, and comics criticism and commentary (often by RevolutionSF.com and The War Eagle Reader]), and has moderated discussion panels and emceed trivia tournaments at science fiction conventions around the US, beginning in 1998. He has appeared as a featured speaker before regional literary guilds and international organizations of English and Writing instructors. He has been an occasional featured speaker at the St Louis Science Center's monthly First Friday pop culture events.

He is the host of multiple weekly or semi-weekly podcast programs, including: The AU Wishbone Podcast, in which he and co-host John Ringer discuss Auburn University College football; The White Rocket Podcast, in which he interviews a different guest each week about a specific pop culture topic; On Her Majesty's Secret Podcast, discussing the James Bond spy films, and The White Rocket Babylon 5 Review Podcast.  All shows are part of the White Rocket Entertainment Network, while the AU Wishbone Podcast is also produced and made available in conjunction with The War Eagle Reader web site. He also appears occasionally on the RevolutionSF "Revcast" Roundtable podcast and the Earth Station One Podcast.

He is the author of nineteen novels and numerous novellas and short stories. He has also co-written and/or edited four non-fiction books on Auburn football, three non-fiction books on comics history, and numerous adventure fiction anthologies from a variety of publishers.

He has written nine volumes and edited one anthology in the Sentinels series of Superhero fiction / pulp adventure novels and stories, which he co-created with Bobby Politte in 1996. These books have been published (volumes one-three) by Swarm Press and (beginning with volume four) by White Rocket Books. Artist Chris Kohler has provided five full-page interior illustrations for each volume.  Sentinels short stories also have been published in A Thousand Faces magazine.

He has written seven novels and one novella in the Shattering space opera series, beginning with Lucian: Dark God's Homecoming in 2009. These books have been published by Airship 27 Productions and by White Rocket Books.

A member of the Pulp Factory writers' and artists' group, Plexico's classic pulp revival novels and novellas have been published by Airship 27 Productions and Pro Se Press, among others.  His Kerry Keen/The Griffon novella, "Conspiracy of Terror," was published by Adamant Entertainment in Thrilling Tales #1 and reprinted in Airship 27's Lance Star - Sky Ranger, Vol. 2.  His science fiction novel, Lucian: Dark God's Homecoming, was published by Airship 27 in summer 2009.  Additionally, two of his short stories were featured in Airship 27's bestselling and multiple award-winning anthology, Sherlock Holmes: Consulting Detective, Vol. 1, also in 2009.  Plexico also serves as an editor for White Rocket Books, editing and helping to publish novels and anthologies by writers such as Mark Bousquet, Jeff Deischer, James Palmer, and I. A. Watson. He has served as assistant editor on multiple projects for Airship 27.

An inductee of the Heroes Magazine Hall of Fame for his early work in the comics fandom community, he was founder (in 1995) and is executive editor of the Avengers-related comic book archives and reference site, AvengersAssemble.  He has also contributed to the Wizard Magazine archives and was chosen by the Rittenhouse Archives to write the text for the backs of Upper Deck's commemorative The Complete Avengers, 1963-Present trading card set, chronicling the year-by-year history of the team.  In 2007 he edited ASSEMBLED!, a critically acclaimed collection of essays analyzing and commenting upon Marvel's Avengers comics, with profits going to the HERO Initiative. A sequel, ASSEMBLED! 2, was published in July 2009.

In September 2010 Plexico became a contributing columnist for the Auburn University sports and popular culture commentary site, The War Eagle Reader. His columns, written with John Ringer, were collected in a single volume, Season of Our Dreams, published in January 2011.  In July 2011, that book made Amazon.com's Top 20 Best Sellers List for books about American football.

In May 2013, Plexico's second nonfiction book about Auburn University football (again with co-author John Ringer), Decades of Dominance: Auburn Football in the Modern Era, was published as a trade paperback  and in June 2013 it climbed to third on Amazon.com's Sports Best Sellers List. Plexico was interviewed about the book on the Alabama Tonight program on Birmingham, Alabama's NBC TV station and on other radio and TV programs.

Writer Kurt Busiek introduced the character of Detective Plexico to the pages of Marvel's Iron Man comic book series in 1999 as a reference to Van Plexico and the Avengers Assemble! Web site. In 2001, writer Keith R. A. DeCandido included a reference to the name Plexico in his Farscape novel, House of Cards, as a nod to Plexico.

Awards

Plexico has won six awards for his science fiction and New Pulp writing:
 "John Blackthorn" won the 2012 New Pulp Award for Best New Pulp Character.
 Legion III: Kings of Oblivion won the 2015 Pulp Factory Award for Pulp Novel of the Year.
 Pride of the Mohicans, an anthology created by and edited by Plexico, won the 2015 Pulp Factory Award for Pulp Anthology of the Year.
 Sentinels: The Dark Crusade won the 2017 Pulp Factory Award for Pulp Novel of the Year.
 Vegas Heist won the 2019 Pulp Factory Award for Pulp Novel of the Year.
 Miami Heist won the 2021 Imadjinn Award for Thriller Novel of the Year.

In addition, his science fiction novel Legion I: Lords of Fire was a shortlisted finalist for the 2014 Pulp Factory Award (Pulp Novel of the Year), Sentinels: Vendetta was a shortlisted finalist for the 2018 Pulp Factory Award (Pulp Novel of the Year), Miami Heist was a shortlisted finalist for the 2020 Pulp Factory Award (Pulp Novel of the Year), and "The Red Flame of Death" was a finalist for Short Story of the Year in the same awards in 2010.  He was also a finalist for the New Pulp Award for Author of the Year in both 2011 and 2012.

The Sentinels Series

Beginning in 2006, Plexico began writing a multi-volume series of Superhero fiction novels and anthologies.  The books are set in the modern day, but include major elements of space opera.  The central character of the series is a teen-aged Asian-American woman who discovers she possesses electromagnetic powers and becomes involved with a US government-run organization known as Project: Sentinel.  Each volume of the series stands alone as a single adventure but the books can be read together as an ongoing, continuous narrative in which the characters grow and change.  As of 2017, the series stands at ten volumes (nine novels and one anthology).  The 2016 volume, the novel The Dark Crusade, won Novel of the Year at the Pulp Factory Awards. The most recent volume, Vendetta, was published by White Rocket Books in May 2017. The seventh volume was published in 2012 and hit #1 on the New Pulp Best Sellers chart in its second week of release.

Bibliography

 Sentinels: When Strikes the Warlord (WRB edition, 2006; Swarm Press edition, 2008), 
 The Complete Avengers 1963-Present Trading Card Set (Writer of the back-of-cards text, Upper Deck/Rittenhouse Archives, 2006)
 Sentinels: A Distant Star (WRB edition, 2007; Swarm Press edition, 2008), 
 Sentinels: Apocalypse Rising (WRB edition, 2007; Swarm Press edition, 2008), 
 Assembled!  Five Decades of Earth’s Mightiest (Editor, 2007), 
 Sentinels: Widescreen Special Edition (Author and Editor, limited edition deluxe hardcover, 2007)
 Sentinels: The Grand Design (Author and Editor, limited edition omnibus paperback, 2007)
 "The Spearhead of Invasion" in A Thousand Faces magazine, issue 3 (2008)
 "Conspiracy of Terror" (A Griffon novella) in Thrilling Tales magazine, issue 1 (2008)
 "Future Shocked" in A Thousand Faces magazine, issue 7 (2009)
 Sentinels: Alternate Visions (Editor, anthology, 2009), 
 The John Carter of Mars Trilogy of Edgar Rice Burroughs (Reprint Editor for White Rocket Books, 2009)
 Introduction to A Princess of Mars by Edgar Rice  Burroughs (White Rocket Books edition, 2009)
 Super Comics Trivia! (Editor, 2009), 
 "The Problem at Stamford Bridge" and "The Adventure of the Tuvan Delegate" in Sherlock Holmes: Consulting Detective, Vol. 1 (Airship 27 Productions/Cornerstone Books; anthology, 2009), 
 Lucian: Dark God's Homecoming (Airship 27 Productions/Cornerstone Books; novel, 2009), 
 Assembled! 2 (White Rocket Books, editor, 2009) 
 Sentinels: The Shiva Advent (White Rocket Books, 2009) 
 "Conspiracy of Terror" in Lance Star - Sky Ranger, Vol. 2 (Airship 27 Productions/ Cornerstone Books; anthology, 2009) 
 Sentinels: Worldmind (White Rocket Books, 2010) 
 Introduction to The Boston Bombers graphic novel by Ron Fortier (Red Bud Studios, 2010)
 Gideon Cain - Demon Hunter, Vol. 1 (Airship 27 Productions; co-creator, co-editor, contributor; anthology, 2010) 
 "Godslayers" in Peculiar Adventures, Vol. 1 (Pro Se Press, pulp magazine, 2010)
 Season of Our Dreams (White Rocket Books; co-author; sports commentary, 2011) 
 Mars McCoy, Space Ranger, Vol. 1 (Airship 27 Productions; co-creator and asst. editor; anthology, 2011) 
 Sentinels: Stellarax (White Rocket Books, 2011) 
 "The Audacity of Hope: A Look Back on the 1994 Streak" in Maple Street Press Tigers Kickoff 2011 (Maple Street Press, sports commentary, 2011)
 "Thunder Over China" in Lance Star, Sky Ranger, Vol. 3 (Airship 27 Productions, anthology, 2011) 
 Blackthorn: Thunder on Mars (White Rocket Books; creator, editor, contributor; anthology, 2011) 
 "Hawk: Hand of the Machine, Part 1" in Pro Se Presents, Issue 7 (Pro Se Press, pulp magazine, February 2012 issue) 
 "Hawk: Hand of the Machine, Part 2" in Pro Se Presents, Issue 8 (Pro Se Press, pulp magazine, March 2012 issue) 
 Hawk: Hand of the Machine (White Rocket Books, novel, 2012) 
 Sentinels: The Grand Design (White Rocket Books, omnibus collection of volumes 1–3, 2012) 
 "The River of Deceit" in Monster Aces (Pro Se Press, anthology, 2012) 
 Sentinels: The Rivals (White Rocket Books, omnibus collection of volumes 4–6, 2012) 
 Sentinels: Metalgod (White Rocket Books, 2012) 
 "Vengeance of the Viper" in The New Adventures of the Griffon (Pro Se Press, anthology, 2013) 
 The Shattering, Legion I: Lords of Fire (White Rocket Books, novel, 2013) 
 Decades of Dominance: Auburn Football in the Modern Era (White Rocket Books, co-author, sports commentary, 2013) 
 "The Devil You Know" in All-Star Pulp Comics Volume 2 (Red Bud Studios, graphic novel anthology, 2013)
 Mars McCoy, Space Ranger, Vol. 2 (Airship 27 Productions; co-creator, asst. editor and contributor, anthology, 2013) 
 MULTIPLEX: The Collected Stories of Van Allen Plexico (White Rocket Books, omnibus collection of short stories, 2013) 
 The Shattering, Legion II: Sons of Terra (White Rocket Books, novel, 2014) 
 Pride of the Mohicans (White Rocket Books, editor, anthology, 2014) 
 The Shattering, Legion III: Kings of Oblivion (White Rocket Books, novel, 2014) 
 Alpha/Omega, Episode 1: Hostile Takeover (Pro Se Press, novella, 2014) 
 The Shattering (White Rocket Books, Omnibus collection of Legion novels, 2014) 
 Alpha/Omega, Episode 2: The Smartest Man on the Moon (Pro Se Press, novella, 2015) 
 Cold Lightning (White Rocket Books, novella, 2015) 
 Baranak: Storming the Gates (White Rocket Books, novel, 2015) 
 "Renegade" in Legends of New Pulp Fiction (Airship 27 Productions, anthology, 2015) 
 "The Red Flame of Death" in All These Shiny Worlds (Creativity Hacker Press, anthology, 2016) 
 Sentinels: The Dark Crusade (White Rocket Books, novel, 2016) 
 Sentinels: Vendetta (White Rocket Books, novel, 2017) 
 Sentinels: The Art of Chris Kohler (White Rocket Books, editor and contributor, 2017)  
 Sentinels: The Earth-Kur-Bai War (White Rocket Books, omnibus collection of volumes 7–9, 2018) 
 Vegas Heist (White Rocket Books, novel, 2018) 
 Karilyne: Heart Cold as Ice (White Rocket Books, novel, 2019) 
 Alpha/Omega (Pro Se Press, novel, 2019) 
 "The Long Crawl of Jonas Kanadee" in Salvage Conquest: Tales from the Salvage Title Universe (Theogony Books, anthology, 2019) 
 Miami Heist (White Rocket Books, novel, 2020) 
 We Believed: A Lifetime of Auburn Football, Vol 1, 1975-1998 (White Rocket Books, co-author, sports commentary, 2021) 
 Gideon Cain: Demon Hunter: Revised and Expanded Edition (White Rocket Books, anthology, 2022) 
 Validus-V (White Rocket Books, novel, 2022) 
 Auburn Basketball: From Barkley to Bruce (White Rocket Books, co-author, sports commentary, 2022)

External links
 Official website

References

People from Sylacauga, Alabama
Novelists from Alabama
21st-century American novelists
American male novelists
American science fiction writers
1968 births
Living people
Auburn University alumni
Georgetown University alumni
Emory University alumni
Perimeter College at Georgia State University faculty
Shorter University faculty
Southwestern Illinois College faculty
American male short story writers
21st-century American short story writers
21st-century American male writers
Novelists from Illinois
Novelists from Georgia (U.S. state)